Isorropus is a genus of moths in the subfamily Arctiinae. The genus was erected by Arthur Gardiner Butler in 1880.

Species
 Isorropus funeralis (Kenrick, 1914)
 Isorropus lateritea Toulgoët, 1957
 Isorropus sanguinolenta (Mabille, 1878)
 Isorropus splendidus Toulgoët, 1957
 Isorropus tricolor Butler, 1880

References

Lithosiini
Moth genera